Fabio Aru (born 3 July 1990) is an Italian former professional road bicycle racer, who rode professionally between 2012 and 2021 for the ,  and  squads. He hails from San Gavino Monreale in Sardinia, and is known for his climbing ability, which made him a favorite for the Grand Tours. He is known as "The Knight of the four Moors", a reference to his native island of Sardinia.

During his career, Aru won stages in all three Grand Tours, including a stage at the Tour de France, three stages at the Giro d'Italia and two stages at the Vuelta a España, and won the 2017 Italian National Road Race Championships. Alongside his stage wins, Aru has also worn the race leader's jersey in all three Grand Tours. In 2014, Aru placed third overall in the Giro d'Italia and fifth in the Vuelta a España. The following year, he finished second in the Giro d'Italia before taking his only overall Grand Tour win at the Vuelta a España. His best finish at the Tour de France came in 2017 where he was 5th.

Career

Early career 
Aru was born in San Gavino Monreale, Sardinia and was raised in Villacidro. At the age of 18 he moved to mainland Italy to pursue a cycling career. He joined the Palazzago team where he won the Giro della Valle d'Aosta in 2011 and 2012. Also in 2012, he finished second behind American rider Joe Dombrowski in the Baby Giro.

Astana (2012–2017) 
Aru joined  during the 2012 season after four years with the Palazzago domestic team in Italy. In 2013 he finished fourth overall in the Giro del Trentino, also claiming the young rider classification. He rode his first Grand Tour, the Giro d'Italia, in support of team leader Vincenzo Nibali. He helped Nibali win the race overall, finishing 42nd himself.

2014 
In 2014, Aru again rode the Giro d'Italia, with the expectation of supporting former winner Michele Scarponi. However, Aru proved stronger than his teammate and on Stage 15 took his first professional victory by winning on the summit finish of Montecampione. Aru went on to finish the Giro in third place overall behind Nairo Quintana and Rigoberto Urán, reaching the podium in just his second Grand Tour. In his next Grand Tour, the Vuelta a España, Aru won the Stage 11 summit finish atop the Santuario de San Miguel de Aralar, attacking the leading group in the final kilometre. He repeated the feat on Stage 18 finishing at Monte Castrove; he escaped with Chris Froome near the end of the climb and outsprinted his rival. He finished the race, won by Alberto Contador, in fifth overall. He finished his season in the Italian Autumn classics, placing fourth in Milano–Torino and ninth in the Giro di Lombardia.

2015 

In 2015, Aru came in sixth at the Volta a Catalunya. In April, he missed the Giro del Trentino because of an intestinal ailment. Greg Henderson accused Aru of faking the ailment, and actually skipping due to a pending biological passport case. Aru promised to sue Henderson for his accusations as he was preparing for the Giro d'Italia. In May 2015, it was announced that Aru's contract with Astana was renewed until the end of 2017. The Giro d'Italia started off poorly for Aru's Astana team, losing seconds to Alberto Contador and the  team. However, in the first week of racing, Aru attacked Contador in the mountains as he was led by his Astana team, remaining only seconds behind Contador in the general classification battle. When Contador crashed on stage 13 in a pile-up, Aru crossed the line well in front of Contador, securing the first pink jersey of his career. However the next day, a  individual time trial, hyped as the Giro's determining day, Aru lost 2 and a half minutes to Contador, thus losing the pink jersey. He lost more time in the Mortirolo stage, but bounced back on Stage 19 to take an emotional solo victory. On Stage 20 featuring the Colle delle Finestre, Aru won his second consecutive stage, taking two minutes from Contador but failing to take the pink jersey.

Aru returned to racing at the Tour de Pologne and finished in 5th place as he prepared for his next season target, the Vuelta a España. He performed well in the first week, taking the red leader's jersey after finishing second on stage 11, the Vuelta's queen stage. He held the lead by a handful of seconds before losing it to Joaquim Rodríguez on stage 16. On stage 17, a  individual time trial, he was able to perform very well and keep himself within 3 seconds of the winner of the stage and new leader of the Vuelta, Tom Dumoulin. Over the final days, Aru attacked Dumoulin repeatedly, trying to place himself back in red. It was not until the penultimate mountain day that Aru succeeded, dropping Dumoulin and advancing himself towards his first Grand Tour win.

2016 
Aru started his 2016 season, at the Volta a la Comunitat Valenciana where he finished 6th overall. He then raced the Volta ao Algarve, and finished 9th overall after taking 2nd place on the last stage. He took his only victory of the season, at the Critérium du Dauphiné where he won Stage 3 after attacking on the downhill inside the last  of the stage. His main goal of the season was the Tour de France, and after Stage 8 Aru was 7th overall but dropped to 13th on the following stage to Andorra Arcalis. He managed to get into the top 10 again on Stage 12 to Mont Ventoux. He had a mechanical problem on the stage, and had problems getting back into the bunch before the climb to Mont Ventoux. He received help from the  team car, as he was paced for a while, resulting in a time penalty post-stage. On the last mountain stage he was not feeling well, and ended up losing 13 minutes to his main rivals, dropping to 13th place in the general classification.

2017 

Going into the 2017 season, Aru was targeting the 100th edition of the Giro d'Italia. He showed good form early on in the season with his first podium place coming at the Tour of Oman, where he finished 3rd overall. He finished 8th overall in his following race at the Abu Dhabi Tour. In April, in a training camp at Sierra Nevada, Aru crashed and hurt his knee. He received no fractures to the knee but it was swollen a lot, and he was recommended by a doctor to stay off the bike for several days in order to recover properly, missing the Giro d'Italia as a result. He returned to racing in June at the Critérium du Dauphiné, and finished 5th overall. One week before the Tour de France, Aru won the Italian National Road Race Championships for the first time in his career. He later described this victory as the best moment in his career.

At the Tour de France, Aru won the 5th stage attacking on the climb to La Planche des Belles Filles,  from the finish line. After that stage he wore the polka dot jersey for three days. On stage 9 he was accused of unsportsmanlike behaviour after attacking yellow jersey holder Chris Froome as the latter suffered from a mechanical issue. The camera captured Aru attacking from behind right when he realized Froome had a mechanical. On stage 12 he attacked on the climb to Peyragudes and he took the yellow jersey from Froome. In the next stages he struggled with bronchitis and he finished fifth overall in his second Tour de France. This was his best general classification finish in a Grand Tour following his 2015 Vuelta a España win, and his win on stage 5 was the ninth and final victory of his career.

UAE Team Emirates (2018–2020)

2018 
He started his season at the Abu Dhabi Tour but only finished 13th overall. At the following race, Tirreno–Adriatico, Aru finished 4th to Sarnano Sassotetto, but was struggling on other decisive stages, meaning he once again missed out on the top 10, in 12th place. His first top 10 finish of the season came at the Tour of the Alps. Aru could not follow the pace of his fellow Giro d'Italia contenders Chris Froome, Thibaut Pinot, Domenico Pozzovivo, Miguel Ángel López and George Bennett, and ended the race in 6th position.

At the Giro d'Italia, he finished alongside many of the strong Giro contenders on the stage to Mount Etna, and moved up to 10th position after the stage. However, on the following mountain stages, Aru did not manage to finish with the strongest riders meaning that he dropped to 22nd place after the 2nd week of racing. However he bounced back on the next stage, which was a mainly flat time trial. He finished 8th on the stage but was later penalised due to pacing. Aru finally withdrew from the race on Stage 19. Aru explained he had suffered from a gluten and dairy intolerance since 2015 but never got to the bottom of it. Aru and his personal coach Paolo Tiralongo made his training too hard, and spent too much time at altitude which meant his body was fatigued already going into the Giro d'Italia. He returned to racing at the end of July, at the Tour de Wallonie, and finished 10th overall. A week later at the Tour de Pologne, Aru finished 10th overall once again. He started the Vuelta a España as one of the main favourites. However his form was fluctuating, and he was over 10 minutes behind Simon Yates, starting stage 17. On the stage, Aru crashed before the final climb which ripped his shorts. Aru reacting angrily while calling for a new bike; as a result, he had to formally apologise to Colnago's Ernesto Colnago by telephone after the stage.

2019 
In March 2019, following a disappointing start of the season, Aru was diagnosed with a constriction of the iliac artery and underwent an angioplasty surgery, which forced him out from racing for several months. As a result, his immediate plans to ride the Volta a Catalunya, as well as the Giro d'Italia were abandoned. Aru was back on his bike at altitude training in Sestriere in May. He made his comeback to racing in June, at the Gran Premio di Lugano where he finished 22nd. A week later he started his first Tour de Suisse.

Team Qhubeka Assos (2021) 
Shortly before the Vuelta a España, Aru announced that he would retire from cycling at the conclusion of the race. His best results from his final season, were a pair of second-place overall finishes at the Sibiu Cycling Tour and the Vuelta a Burgos.

Personal life 
Aru resides in the Swiss city of Lugano, a few kilometres north of the Italian border. Aru suffers from a gluten and dairy intolerance which means he struggles with food intake. He has cut away dairy from his diet, and has also limited the amount of pasta he eats in order to keep his diet on track. After his retirement from cycle racing, Aru expressed an interest in competing in triathlon in the future.

Major results 

2010
 2nd Trofeo Gianfranco Bianchin
 4th Overall Giro della Valle d'Aosta
 5th Giro del Belvedere
2011
 1st  Overall Giro della Valle d'Aosta
1st Stage 6 (ITT)
 2nd Road race, National Under-23 Road Championships
 2nd Overall Toscana-Terra di Ciclismo
 4th Overall Giro Ciclistico d'Italia
 6th Gran Premio Palio del Recioto
 10th Giro del Medio Brenta
2012
 1st  Overall Giro della Valle d'Aosta
1st Stage 3
 1st  Overall Toscana-Terra di Ciclismo
 2nd Overall Baby Giro
 4th Gran Premio Palio del Recioto
 8th Trofeo Banca Popolare di Vicenza
2013
 4th Overall Giro del Trentino
1st  Young rider classification
 7th Tre Valli Varesine
 8th Overall Tour of Austria
2014
 3rd Overall Giro d'Italia
1st Stage 15
 4th Milano–Torino
 5th Overall Vuelta a España
1st Stages 11 & 18
 7th Overall Giro del Trentino
 9th Giro di Lombardia
2015
 1st  Overall Vuelta a España
 2nd Overall Giro d'Italia
1st  Young rider classification
1st Stages 19 & 20
Held  after Stage 13
 2nd Overall Abu Dhabi Tour
 2nd Tour of Almaty
 3rd Milano–Torino
 5th Overall Tour de Pologne
 5th Overall UCI World Tour
 6th Overall Volta a Catalunya
2016
 1st Stage 3 Critérium du Dauphiné
 4th Overall Giro di Toscana
 4th Giro dell'Emilia
 6th Road race, Olympic Games
 6th Overall Volta a la Comunitat Valenciana
 6th Milano–Torino
 9th Overall Volta ao Algarve
 9th Tre Valli Varesine
2017
 1st  Road race, National Road Championships
 3rd Overall Tour of Oman
 3rd Milano–Torino
 5th Overall Tour de France
1st Stage 5
Held  after Stages 12–13
Held  after Stages 5–7
 5th Overall Critérium du Dauphiné
 7th Giro di Lombardia
 8th Overall Abu Dhabi Tour
 8th Tre Valli Varesine
2018
 6th Overall Tour of the Alps
 9th Milano–Torino
 10th Overall Tour de Pologne
 10th Overall Tour de Wallonie
2019
 8th Trofeo Campos, Porreres, Felanitx, Ses Salines
2020
 5th Mont Ventoux Dénivelé Challenge
 9th Overall Vuelta a Burgos
 10th Overall Tour de l'Ain
2021
 2nd Overall Vuelta a Burgos
 2nd Overall Sibiu Cycling Tour

General classification results timeline

Monuments results timeline

References

External links 
 

1990 births
2014 Vuelta a España stage winners
Cyclists at the 2016 Summer Olympics
Italian Giro d'Italia stage winners
Italian male cyclists
Italian Tour de France stage winners
Italian Vuelta a España stage winners
Living people
Olympic cyclists of Italy
People from the Province of South Sardinia
Cyclists from Sardinia
Vuelta a España winners